The Dibrugarh Municipal Board is one of the oldest municipalities in North East India, established in 1873. The city since then has become an important nerve center of political, administrative, cultural and commercial activities of a vast region comprising entire eastern Assam, Arunachal Pradesh and Nagaland.It is upgraded to Municipal Corporation in October 2021.Assam Assembly passed The Assam Municipal Corporation (Amendment) Bill on 16.09.2022. With this, Silchar & Dibrugarh Municipal Boards have been converted to Corporations.

History

The British arrived in Assam in 1826 as per Yandaboo Accord and since then they selected Dibrugarh as a centre of Administration as well as business purpose in Upper Assam. In 1842 Dibrugarh was announced as the headquarters of Lakhimpur District. The court was also shifted to Dibrugarh in the same year from Lakhimpur.

Geography

Dibrugarh is located along 27' 28' N latitude and 94' 35' E longitude. The municipal area of Dibrugarh is 15.5 km2 and is divided into 22 wards.

References

Dibrugarh
Local government in Assam